Don't You Worry, Honey is the second studio album by American indie pop trio Sir Sly. It was released on June 30, 2017 by Interscope Records.

Track listing

Critical reception 

Despite having two songs that charted in the Billboard Alternative and Rock Songs list, the album was not heavily reviewed by mainstream contemporary music critics.

Personnel
The following individuals were credited for composing the album.

 Chancellor Bennett — Composer
 Hayden Coplen	— Composer
 Andraé Crouch	— Composer
 François de Roubaix — Composer
 David Francis Del Sesto — Composer
 Jeff Gitelman	— Composer
 Andy Hernandez — Composer
 Landon Jacobs — Composer
 Quincy Jones — Composer

 Greg Landfair, Jr. — Composer
 Bill Maxwell — Composer
 Gunter Platzek — Composer
 Nico Segal — Composer
 David Del Sesto — Composer
 Sir Sly — Primary Artist
 Jason Suwito — Composer
 Peter Wilkins — Composer
 Peter Yorke — Composer

Charting 
The album did not chart, however two tracks, High and &Run, made the Top 10 on the Alternative Songs chart.; only being available digitally and on vinyl may have depressed the album's charting.

References

2017 albums
Sir Sly albums